Schnitzler's horseshoe bat (Rhinolophus schnitzleri) is a species of bat in the family Rhinolophidae. It is endemic to China.

Taxonomy 
The bat was first described by Wu Yi  and Vu Dinh Thong in 2011. The holotype was collected in Xiao-dong Cave, Yunnan province, about 50 km from Kunming City.The species is named after Professor Hans-Ulrich Schnitzler in recognition of his contribution to the study of bats.

It belongs to the philippinensis species group.

Description 
The bat is a large species of the genus Rhinolophus. It also possesses very large ears. The bat is light brown and chestnut on the ventral and dorsal regions, respectively. The interfemoral and wing membranes are a brown color. The horseshoe is a light grey in color. It is broad and almost circular in shape. It is posteriorly contiguous with the anterior face of the lancet, and greatly exceeds the breadth of the muzzle. It has no supplementary leaflets.

Habitat and distribution 
The bat is known only from the holotype inhabiting the Yunnan province in China. It is cave dwelling.

Conservation 
Not much is known about the bat. However, as it is a cave-dwelling species, usual threats to cave-dwelling bats, such as in-roost disturbance probably affect it.

References 

Rhinolophidae
Mammals described in 2011
Bats of Asia